Malta Marriott Hotel & Spa, formerly Le Méridien St. Julian's, is a 5-star hotel located on the Maltese Islands. The hotel was built on the grounds of a 19th-century Villa. The premises of the hotel are situated across the promenade of Balluta Bay in St. Julian's.

Malta Marriott Hotel & Spa is part of Marriott International and offers 5-star accommodation with 301 contemporary guestrooms.

Its available restaurants and bars are:
Marketplace (Buffet Restaurant)
 Taro at The Villa (A La Carte Restaurant)
 Nori at The Villa (A La Carte Restaurant)
Atrio Lobby Bar & Restaurant
 M Club Lounge
The Sundeck (Seasonal)

Malta Marriott Hotel & Spa works in collaboration with Myoka Spa, whose management is handling the Spa Facilities of the hotel.

The spa facilities of the hotel include:
 Heated tropical indoor pool
 Jacuzzi
 Sauna & Hammam
 Treatment rooms
 Relaxation area
 Fitness center

Malta Marriott Hotel & Spa has a rooftop outdoor pool (The Sundeck) and a floor dedicated to conference facilities with 13 meeting rooms. The hotel is open all year round.

References

External links
 http://www.maltamarriott.com/

Hotels in Malta
St. Julian's, Malta
Hotels established in 2020
Hotel buildings completed in 2020
2020 establishments in Malta